Vulgaxanthins are a group of betaxanthins, or the predominant yellow plant pigments found in red beets, among other plants like Mirabilis jalapa and swiss chard.  They are antioxidant pigments, types I, II, III, IV, and V.  Like all betaxanthins, they cannot be hydrolyzed by acid to aglycone without degradation.  Water activity also affects stability of this antioxidant.  It has been studied as a natural nutritional additive but instability remains a problem.

Reactions
Vulgaxanthin-II + Ammonia + NADH = Vulgaxanthin-I + NAD+ + H2O 
Vulgaxanthin-I + H2O = Vulgaxanthin-II + Ammonia 
Vulgaxanthin-II + ATP + Ammonia = Vulgaxanthin-I + ADP + Orthophosphate 
Vulgaxanthin-II + ATP + Ammonia = Vulgaxanthin-I + Diphosphate + 5'-AMP 
Betalamic acid + L-Glutamine + ATP = Vulgaxanthin-I + ADP + Orthophosphate

See also
 Indicaxanthin

References

Biological pigments
Food antioxidants
Betalains